Betty Roe (born 30 July 1930) is an English composer, singer, vocal coach, and conductor.

Biography
Betty Roe was born in North Kensington, London, England. Her father was a fishmonger at the Shepherd's Bush Market, and her mother was a bookkeeper. Roe took piano lessons from the age of six with local teacher Madam Dorina. She began writing music and arrangements in her teens during World War II when assisting with choirs at the local church. As a Junior Exhibitioner she studied piano with Fiona Addie, Muriel Dale, and Sadie MacCormack, and cello with Alison Dalrymple at the Royal Academy of Music, but left school in 1947 and took a job as a filing clerk. She continued at the Royal Academy in 1949, studying piano with York Bowen, cello with Alison Dalrymple, and voice with Jean McKenzie-Grieve. She continued her study of singing with Clive Carey, Roy Hickman, Peter van der Stolk, and Margaret Field-Hyde, and studied composition with Lennox Berkeley.

In the 1950s Roe became involved with a drama group where she began writing for musicals. She also worked as a sessions singer with London ensembles, and in light entertainment with celebrities including Cliff Richard, Harry Secombe, Cilla Black, The Two Ronnies (with whom she appeared on television conducting "The Plumstead Ladies Male Voice Choir") and on Top of the Pops.

Roe married John Bishop and had three children. She was Director of Music at the London Academy of Music and Dramatic Art from 1968–78, and founded the NorthKen Choir/Chorale/Opera in the 1960s. She founded Thames Publishing with her husband in 1970. After his death in 2000 Thames Publishing became a division of William Elkin Music Services.

Roe received an MBE for services to Classical Music and Composition in the 2011 New Year Honours.

Works
Roe has composed over 300 solo songs, as well as choral and sacred music, musicals, operas, instrumental pieces, and music for schools. Malcolm Williamson admired her Magnificat and Nunc Dimitis (1962) and arranged for it to be published. Christus Victor (1964) set words by John Catterick, the Rector of Ashwell Parish Church. It prefigured the use of popular music forms in church music, and was published by Novello. Alan Ridout described it as "the next Stainer's Crucifixion".

Her best known song is perhaps 'Nursery Rhyme of Innocence and Experience', one of three Charles Causley settings for children's voices collected under the title Union Street in 1971). Roe herself has cited the Three Herrick Songs (1969) for soprano and wind quintet as "one of the best things I have written".

Other vocal works include:

Diva's Lament, words by Jacqueline Froom (1995)
All The Day, four songs to words by Leonard Clark, Thames Publishing
Four Ponder Songs
Noble Numbers, words by Robert Herrick (1972)
Three Childhoods, words by Charles Causley, for two part choir
Three Shakespeare Songs

Her compositions have been recorded and issued on CD, including:
The Family Tree, music for children (Audio CD - March 31, 1998) Somm Recordings, ASIN: B000006B6U
 Jazz Songs; Euphonium Dance and Madam and the Minister, Centaur Records CRC 2510 (1997)
Music for Children By Betty Roe (Audio CD - Feb 24, 1998) Somm Recordings, ASIN: B0000265HD
The Music Tree: Solo Songs by Betty Roe (Audio CD - Mar 31, 1998) Somm Recordings, ASIN: B000006B6T
 Noble Numbers, Signum Classics CD SIGCD161 (2009)
 The Silver Hound and other songs (Audio CD - July 2017), Divine Art Recordings, MSV 28566

Works with Marian Lines
Roe has worked in partnership with librettist Marian Lines to produce six operas, twelve musicals, a pantomime, and a number of choral works.

Opera:
The Legend of Gallant Bevis of Southampton (1977)
Gaslight
A Flight of Pilgrims (1992)
Lunch at the Cooked Goose (2000)
Welcome to Purgatory (2003)
Brunel: The Little Man in the Tall Hat (2006)
Swindon: The Opera (2012)

Musicals:
The Barnstormers (1976)
Kookajoo and the Magic Forest
The Most Wanted Faces (1978)
Pardon our Rubbish
Christmas Boxes (1980) From which are extracted the songs, Christmas Cards.
The Trouble with spells is... (1982)
The Mistress of Charlecote Park
Destination London (Contributed two numbers)
The Miracle Masque (1983)
The Pink Parakeet (1984)
Crowds (1988)
Astron (1994)
The Storm Hound (1996) Based on the legend of Black Shuck
Floating (2002)
The Magic Fishbone (Awaiting publication) Based on the short story by Charles Dickens

Choral works:
Burd Ellen (1976)
A Crown of Briar Roses (1977) For Queen Elizabeth II’s Silver Jubilee
Circe Beguiled, a scena (1978).  An encounter between Odysseus and the witch Circe.
A Quire of Elements (1978)
The Blacksmith and the Changeling
Songs for City Children
The Family Tree (1982)
A Cat's Tale (1990)
A Cycle of Elements (1995)
St George and the Dragon (1995)
Sing the Millennium (1999)
Dick Whittington (2005)
Blue John (2012)

References

External links
Official site with full list of works
 Betty Roe Society

1930 births
20th-century British composers
20th-century classical composers
20th-century British conductors (music)
20th-century English singers
20th-century English women singers
21st-century British conductors (music)
21st-century English women musicians
21st-century classical pianists
Alumni of the Royal Academy of Music
British vocal coaches
English classical cellists
English classical composers
English conductors (music)
English opera composers
English classical pianists
English women pianists
Women classical composers
Women opera composers
Living people
Musicians from London
People associated with the London Academy of Music and Dramatic Art
People from Kensington
20th-century women composers
20th-century cellists
21st-century cellists
Women conductors (music)
20th-century women pianists
21st-century women pianists